TAFE Queensland Gold Coast was formed from the Gold Coast Institute of TAFE (or GCIT) in 2013 on 1 July. The vocational education and training (VET) organisation services the Gold Coast region of Queensland, Australia, with five campuses across suburbs including Southport, Coomera, Ashmore and Coolangatta.

As of 1 July 2017, TAFE Queensland Gold Coast was consolidated with TAFE Queensland's five other regional registered training organisations (RTOs) to form a single RTO. TAFE Queensland Gold Coast no longer exists as a separate RTO.

Campus locations

 Ashmore
 Coolangatta
 Coomera
 Coomera Marine
 Southport

See also
TAFE Queensland

References

External links
 TAFE Queensland
 TAFE Queensland Gold Coast

TAFE Queensland
Education on the Gold Coast, Queensland
Schools on the Gold Coast, Queensland
Education in Queensland